Francisco Casavella was the pseudonym of Francisco Garcia Hortelano (15 October 1963 – 17 December 2008), a Spanish novelist.

He never used his real name to sign his works, as his surname coincides with that of another novelist, Juan García Hortelano.

Biography 

Francisco Casavella began his literary career upon obtaining at 27 the Tigre Juan Award to the best unpublished novel with his work El triunfo [The triumph] (1990), which was followed by Quédate [Stay] (1993), Un enano español se suicida en Las Vegas [A Spanish dwarf commits suicide in Las Vegas] (1997), the juvenile novel El secreto de las fiestas [The secret of the parties] (1997) and the trilogy El día del Watusi [The day of the Watusi], formed by "Los juegos feroces" [The ferocious games] (2002), "Viento y joyas" [Wind and jewels] (2002) and "El idioma imposible" [The impossible language] (2003), a portrait of Barcelona in the last quarter of the 20th century, from the chabolismo of the late Franco years to the Olympic Games of 1992 and the financial scandals of the 1990s. In 2008 he won the Premio Nadal with the last novel he ever published, Lo que sé de los vampiros [What I know of vampires], a historical tragicomedy situated in 18th century Europe. It has been translated into different languages.

He was the screenwriter of the movie Antártida [Antarctica] (1995), the film director Manuel Huerga's first work, and of the TV movie for the Catalan TV 
Dues dones [Two women] (1998, Enric Folch). He also wrote for the print media, e.g. for the newspaper El País, and for Co&Co' magazine.

He died on 17 December 2008, at age 45, from a heart attack, only eleven months after winning the Premio Nadal.

Works
The Triumph (1990 Versal), Tigre Juan Prize novel
Stay (1993, Ediciones B)
A Spanish dwarf commits suicide in Las Vegas (1997, Anagram)
The secret of festivals (1997, Anaya)
On the Watusi. The fierce games (2002, Mondadori)
On the Watusi. Wind and jewels (2002, Mondadori)
On the Watusi. The language impossible (2003, Mondadori)
What I know of the Vampires (2008, Target), Nadal Prize 2008

References

1963 births
2008 deaths
20th-century Spanish novelists
21st-century Spanish novelists
Writers from Catalonia
Spanish male novelists
20th-century Spanish male writers
21st-century Spanish male writers